Alex Vetchinsky ( Alec Hyman Vetchinsky; 9 November 1904 - 4 March 1980) was a BAFTA nominated British film art director and production designer. He worked on more than a hundred productions during a career that lasted between 1928 and 1974. Vetchinsky was employed for many years at Gainsborough Pictures. He later worked frequently for Rank, including on several Carry On films.

Selected filmography

 Balaclava (1928)
 Symphony in Two Flats (1930)
 Sunshine Susie (1931)
 The Faithful Heart (1932)
 The Lucky Number (1932)
 Marry Me (1932)
 The Man from Toronto (1933)
 It's a Boy (1933)
 Soldiers of the King (1933)
 Aunt Sally (1934)
 Stormy Weather (1935)
 The Phantom Light (1935)
 Tudor Rose (1936)
 All In (1936)
 Good Morning, Boys (1937)
 Said O'Reilly to McNab (1937)
 Convict 99 (1938)
 Shipyard Sally (1939)
 A Girl Must Live (1939)
 Night Train to Munich (1940)
 Kipps (1941)
 Cottage to Let (1941)
 The Young Mr. Pitt (1942)
 Tawny Pipit (1944)
 Don't Take It to Heart (1944)
 Waterloo Road (1945)
 The October Man (1947)
 The Mark of Cain (1947)
 Hungry Hill (1947)
 Escape (1948)
 It's Hard to Be Good (1948)
 Morning Departure (1950)
 Highly Dangerous (1950)
 Waterfront (1950)
 Night Without Stars (1951)
 Hunted (1952)
 The Black Knight (1954)
 Passage Home (1955)
 Value for Money (1955)
 A Town Like Alice (1956)
 Carry on Sergeant (1958)
 Operation Amsterdam (1959)
 Rotten to the Core (1965) (received BAFTA nomination)
 Doctor in Clover (1966)
 The Long Duel (1967)
 Carry On... Up the Khyber (1968)
 Kidnapped (1971)
 Gold (1974)

References

External links

1904 births
1980 deaths
British film designers
British art directors
Film people from London